Romeu Fernando Fernandes da Silva (born 4 March 1954), known simply as Romeu, is a retired Portuguese footballer who played as a central midfielder.

Football career
Born in Vila Praia de Âncora, Caminha, Viana do Castelo, Romeu made his professional debuts with Vitória de Guimarães, first appearing with the first team not yet aged 19. After a career-best ten goals in 28 matches in 1974–75, he caught the attention of S.L. Benfica, where he would however appear rarely over the course of two Primeira Liga seasons.

After reviving his career with his first club, Romeu moved in 1979 to FC Porto, where he would be much more used than at Benfica, in a four-season spell. The northern side however, only won one Portuguese Supercup, in 1981.

Aged 29, Romeu joined the last of the Big Three, Sporting Clube de Portugal. Except for his debut campaign, he would not be more than a fringe player as the team came totally empty on silverware, and finally retired in 1988 after one-year spells with modest S.C. Salgueiros and Amora FC (the latter in division two).

In the 90s/2000s, Romeu had several spells as a manager, also working with Benfica as a scout and match observer (1999–2001). During eight years, still as a player, he appeared eight times for the Portugal national team.

External links

1954 births
Living people
Portuguese footballers
Association football midfielders
Primeira Liga players
Vitória S.C. players
S.L. Benfica footballers
FC Porto players
Sporting CP footballers
S.C. Salgueiros players
Portugal under-21 international footballers
Portugal international footballers
Portuguese football managers
Primeira Liga managers
Vitória S.C. managers
U.S.C. Paredes managers
G.D. Interclube managers
Expatriate football managers in Angola
Portuguese expatriate sportspeople in Angola
Girabola managers
Sportspeople from Viana do Castelo District